Céline Émilie Seurre (7 September 1873 in Paris – 3 September 1966 in Trouville-sur-Mer), known as Cécile Sorel or the Comtesse de Ségur by marriage, was a French comic actress. She enjoyed great popularity and was known for her extravagant costumes.

Biography
Sorel was attracted to the theater at an early age, studying with Louis-Arsène Delaunay and Marie Favart. In 1899, she began her career at the Odéon and then, in 1901, became a member of the Comédie-Française, where she specialized in playing a stock character known as the "grande coquette". She was especially well known for her portrayal of Célimène in The Misanthrope. In 1904, she became the 339th "Sociétaire de la Comédie-Française" and remained with the theater until 1933.

Although long engaged to Whitney Warren, an American architect who was related to the Vanderbilts, she eventually married the Comte de Ségur-Lamoignon, great grandson of the famous Comtesse de Ségur, who acted under the name Guillaume de Sax. They were sometimes mocked as "beauty and the beast" and were separated after fifteen years, but she kept the title of "Comtesse" for the rest of her life.

In 1909, she had the starring role in La Tosca, a film by André Calmettes and Charles Le Bargy. Her next film role did not come until 1937, when she played an aged courtesan in The Pearls of the Crown by Sacha Guitry. Four years later, she essentially played herself in a sketch comedy called Les Petits riens, written by and starring Yves Mirande. In 1944, she barely escaped the bombing that destroyed the Théâtre-Français in Rouen.

In 1950, she underwent a "conversion" and, following the lead of the original Comtesse de Ségur, took her vows as a Third-order Franciscan. She adopted the name "Soeur Cécile de l'Enfant-Jésus" and devoted her time to writing. A television documentary of her career was produced in 1965. She died of complications from a fractured hip, suffered in a fall at her rented château on the French coast, and was buried in the Cimetière du Montparnasse.

She was painted by François Flameng and her likeness appears in a fresco by Charles Hoffbauer on the ceiling of the cupola at the Château d'Artigny in Montbazon, once owned by François Coty. A college in the town of Mériel is named after her.

References

Further reading 
 Cécile Sorel: An Autobiography ("Les Belles Heures de Ma Vie") translated by Philip John Stead, Staples Press, 1953. Roy Publishers, 1954.
 La confession de Célimène, Volume 2 of "Souvenirs", Presses de la Cité, 1949

External links 

 "Hommage à Célimène (Cécile Sorel)", a video narrated by Béatrix Dussane from the Institut national de l'audiovisuel (INA).
 "Comtesse de Ségur", a video by Henry Magnan and Yannick Bellon from the INA.
 Documents related to Cécile Sorel @ Gallica.
 

1873 births
1966 deaths
French stage actresses
French film actresses
French silent film actresses
20th-century French actresses
Comédie-Française
Sociétaires of the Comédie-Française
Burials at Montparnasse Cemetery
Actresses from Paris
Deaths from falls
Secular Franciscans